No. 587 Squadron RAF was an anti-aircraft co-operation squadron of the Royal Air Force from 1943 to 1946.

History
The squadron was formed at RAF Weston Zoyland, England on 1 December 1943, from 1600 Flight, 1601 Flight and 1625 Flight for anti-aircraft co-operation duties over Wales and the south east of England. It operated a variety of aircraft. By June 1944 it was part of No. 70 Group RAF, Air Defence of Great Britain.

Due to the ongoing training requirement the squadron was not disbanded at the end of the war and it moved to RAF Tangmere on 1 June 1946 to cover the south coast, but was disbanded shortly afterwards on 15 June 1946.

Aircraft operated

Squadron bases

References

Citations

Bibliography

External links
 Short 587 Squadron history on new MOD site
 Squadron histories for nos. 541–598 sqn on RafWeb's Air of Authority – A History of RAF Organisation

No. 587
Royal Air Force aircraft squadrons
Military units and formations established in 1943
587 Squadron